TechnoServe is an international nonprofit that promotes business solutions to poverty in the developing world by linking people to information, capital and markets. It is a registered 501(c)(3) based in Washington, D.C., with over 1,540 employees across 29 countries worldwide.

Overview
TechnoServe's mission is to work with enterprising people in the developing world to build competitive firms, businesses and industries. They aim to grow strong markets that create income, jobs, and wealth for individuals in poor communities.

TechnoServe works with individuals and businesses to address local or regional constraints that prevent market systems from operating efficiently. The organization focuses on market systems that have a clear opportunity, the potential for inclusive growth, and the potential for scale. TechnoServe addresses market system failures in three ways:

 Developing capacity: TechnoServe helps individuals and communities acquire necessary skills, share relevant knowledge, and apply productive technologies needed to build successful farms and businesses.
 Strengthening market connections: TechnoServe helps coordinate industry players and connect emerging businesses and farms to capital, networks, and suppliers.
 Improving the business environment: TechnoServe helps encourage self-sustaining economic activity by addressing the policies, information, and incentives that help markets function better.

In 2016, TechnoServe’s work benefited 3 million people in 29 countries.

History

Early Years
TechnoServe was founded in 1968 by businessman and philanthropist Ed Bullard after his experience volunteering at a hospital in rural Ghana. He was inspired to start an organization that would help hardworking people harness the power of private enterprise to lift themselves out of poverty. So in 1968, Ed launched TechnoServe – short for “technology in the service of mankind” – to help poor people by connecting them to information and market opportunities.

In 1969, TechnoServe undertook its first project, assisting the construction of a 2,000 square foot feed mill for the production of poultry and eggs in Honduras. TechnoServe helped locate sources of capital and an experienced feed mill operator to direct the first nine months of operation in order to secure the project’s growth and success.

By 1971, TechnoServe had begun work in several other countries across Latin America, the Caribbean and Africa. These early efforts marked the beginning of what would proliferate into more comprehensive projects across the globe over the next several decades.

Notable projects

East Africa Dairy Development

Funded by the Bill & Melinda Gates Foundation and implemented in partnership with Heifer International, the East Africa Dairy Development project aims to double the dairy incomes of 179,000 smallholder farm families — or approximately one million men, women and children— in Kenya, Uganda and Rwanda within 10 years. The program facilitates improved dairy production, business practices, and market access by developing chilling plant hubs.

The Haiti Hope Project

The Haiti Hope Project is a five-year partnership designed to create sustainable economic opportunities for Haitian mango farmers and their families. The project aims to double the incomes of 25,000 smallholder mango farmers five years after they join the project. It is a public-private partnership of The Coca-Cola Company; the Multilateral Investment Fund (MIF), a member of the Inter-American Development Bank (IDB); the U.S. Agency for International Development (USAID); and TechnoServe.

Impulsa Tu Empresa

With support from the Argidius Foundation, Impulsa Tu Empresa aims to help more than 800 small and medium-sized enterprises develop their business. Through mentoring, business training and business plan competitions, the program aims to increase sales by $13 million and generate 750 new jobs in Guatemala, Honduras, Nicaragua and Burkina Faso.

Project Nurture

A partnership with The Coca-Cola Company and the Bill & Melinda Gates Foundation, Project Nurture is a five-year project that aims to help more than 50,000 small-scale mango and passion fruit farmers in Kenya and Uganda double their fruit incomes. In addition to identifying new market opportunities, TechnoServe advisors are working with farmers to improve productivity and develop strong farmer business groups.

Strengthening Rural Youth Development Through Enterprise

TechnoServe and the Mastercard Foundation have partnered on an $11.5 million, four-year program beginning in 2011 to help rural young women and men in East Africa transition to economic independence. The Strengthening Rural Youth Development through Enterprise (STRYDE) program delivers a comprehensive package of services including skills training, business development and mentoring to young people ages 18 to 30 in Kenya, Rwanda and Uganda, aiming to assist 15,000 people by the end of the program.

Technical Assistance Facility
TechnoServe serves as the manager of the Technical Assistance Facility (TAF), which supports the African Agriculture Fund, a private equity fund, to address food security challenges across Africa. TAF provides technical assistance to small- and medium-sized enterprises invested in by the African Agriculture Fund, and improves linkages between enterprises and smallholder outgrowers.

References

External links
 TechnoServe

Development charities based in the United States
Charities based in Washington, D.C.
Organizations established in 1968